German submarine U-384 was a Type VIIC U-boat of Nazi Germany's Kriegsmarine during World War II.

She carried out two patrols and sank one ship on each patrol. She was a member of three wolfpacks. On her second patrol, she was sunk by a British aircraft southwest of Iceland on 19 March 1943.

Design
German Type VIIC submarines were preceded by the shorter Type VIIB submarines. U-384 had a displacement of  when at the surface and  while submerged. She had two shafts and two  propellers.

U-384 was fitted with five  torpedo tubes (four fitted at the bow and one at the stern), fourteen torpedoes, one  SK C/35 naval gun, 220 rounds, and two twin  C/30 anti-aircraft guns. The boat had a complement of between forty-four and sixty.

Service history
The submarine was laid down on 29 March 1941 at the Howaldtswerke at Kiel as yard number 15, launched on 28 May 1942 and commissioned on 18 July under the command of Oberleutnant zur See Hans-Achim von Rosenberg-Gruszcynski.

She served with the 5th U-boat Flotilla from 18 July 1942 and the 3rd flotilla from 1 January 1943.

First patrol
U-359s first patrol took her from Kiel in Germany on 12 December 1942. She sank the Louise Lykes in mid-Atlantic on 9 January 1943. She then docked at La Pallice in occupied France on 3 February.

Second patrol and loss
Having left La Pallice on 6 March 1943, she sank the Coracero on 17 March. On 19 March, she was sunk by a British Boeing B-17 Flying Fortress of No. 206 Squadron RAF.

47 men died in the U-boat; there were no survivors.

Previously recorded fate
U-361 was originally noted as sunk on 20 March 1943 by a British Sunderland flying boat of 201 Squadron. This attack was against . No damage was sustained.

Wolfpacks
U-384 took part in three wolfpacks, namely:
 Falke (28 December 1942 – 19 January 1943) 
 Landsknecht (19 – 26 January 1943) 
 Stürmer (11 – 19 March 1943)

Summary of raiding history

References

Bibliography

External links

German Type VIIC submarines
U-boats commissioned in 1942
U-boats sunk in 1943
U-boats sunk by British aircraft
U-boats sunk by depth charges
1942 ships
Ships built in Kiel
Ships lost with all hands
World War II submarines of Germany
Maritime incidents in March 1943